Paul Hardcastle is the eponymous album by crossover jazz artist Paul Hardcastle, released in 1985 on the Chrysalis Records label.

The album featured the major hit "19", as well as the further top ten "Don't Waste My Time".

Track listing
All songs written by Paul Hardcastle, except "Just for Money" co-written with Kim Fuller, and "19", co-written with Jonas McCord and William Couturié.

Charts

References

External links 
 Paul Hardcastle at Discogs

1985 albums
Paul Hardcastle albums
Boogie albums
Freestyle music albums
Chrysalis Records albums